Cerambyx welensii is a species of beetle in the family Cerambycidae (longhorn beetles).

Subspecies
Subspecies include:
 Cerambyx welensii centurio Czwalina, 1891 
 Cerambyx welensii welensii Küster, 1846

Distribution
This species is widespread in Southern Europe, North Africa, and the Near East. It is present in Albania, Bosnia and Herzegovina, Bulgaria, Croatia, France, Greece, Hungary, Italy, Jordan, Lebanon, Malta, Morocco, Portugal, Romania, Sicily, Slovakia, Slovenia, Spain, Syria, Tunisia, Morocco, Jordan, Lebanon, Israel and Azerbaijan.

Description
These beetles have an elongated body. Antennae of males extend beyond the apex of the elytra by last three antennal segments. The basic color is brownish, with clearer apex of the elytra. Elytra are  entirely covered by a thick, white to yellowish setae and have rounded apex. The pronotum shows a thorny tubercle on its sides. This species is rather similat to Cerambyx carinatus. and to Cerambyx cerdo.

Biology
Larvae of these beetles are xylophagous. They mainly feed on downy oak  (Quercus pubescens), evergreen oak (Quercus ilex) and cork oak (Quercus suber). These longhorn beetle are considered a pest of oaks. Females are polyandrous and males are polygynous.

References

Cerambycini
Beetles of Asia
Beetles of Europe
Beetles of North Africa
Beetles described in 1846